Clemensia plumbeifusca is a moth of the family Erebidae. It is found in Peru.

The wingspan is about 18 mm. The forewings are dark brown, suffused with silvery blue-grey. There is an indistinctly double postmedial series of slight white points and a subterminal series of slight white points. The hindwings are dark brown suffused with silvery blue-grey.

References

Cisthenina
Moths described in 1918